The Church of St Simon is a Church of England parish church in Shepherd's Bush, London. It was built circa 1879 - 1886, designed by architect Sir Arthur Blomfield in the Gothic Revival style with a tower. The church is located on the south side of Shepherd's Bush Green on Rockley Road.

History

19th century

St  Simon's church is a late Victorian church building built from 1879 - 1886, and designed by the noted architect Sir Arthur Blomfield. The foundation stone was laid on 6 March 1878 by the philanthropist and evangelical Anglican John Derby Allcroft, MP for Worcester. The first service was conducted in 1880.

The chancel, parish hall and spire were completed in 1886. The tower and spire are polychrome with horizontal bands of stonework.

The organ dates from 1865, and was purchased from Dunblane Cathedral in 1893. The organ states that it was "rebuilt by Eustace Ingram, London 1893".

20th century
In 1903 stained glass was installed in the East window to commemorate the first vicar, the Reverend Robert Handcock.

St Simon's in the present day
Today St Simon's is surrounded by late Victorian and early Edwardian terraced housing, and is located a few hundred yards south of Shepherd's Bush Green. It retains its original imposing spire and clock tower. The vicar is The Reverend Cameron Collington.

See also
History of Shepherd's Bush
List of Commissioners' churches in London
St Stephen's Church, Shepherd's Bush

Gallery

Notes

References
Denny, Barbara, Hammersmith and Shepherd's Bush Past, Historical Publications Ltd, London 1995
 National Heritage List For England: Church of St Simon, Rockley Road https://historicengland.org.uk/listing/the-list/list-entry/137608

External links
Official St Simon's website Retrieved 22 January 2020
Official St Simon's Facebook page Retrieved 22 January 2020
 

Shepherd's Bush
Gothic Revival church buildings in London
Diocese of London
Shepherd's Bush
Religious organizations established in 1879